Shiv Kunal Verma is an Indian military historian and a documentary filmmaker who has produced documentaries on Indian defence services, particularly the Kargil War. He is perhaps best known for the book 1962: The War That Wasn't, a study of the Sino-Indian War that occurred in 1962 between India and China. Verma was educated at The Doon School and Madras Christian College.

Selected bibliography

References

External links
 Profile on Aleph Book Company

1952 births
Living people
The Doon School alumni
Madras Christian College alumni
Indian male journalists
Indian military writers
Writers from Delhi
20th-century Indian historians
21st-century Indian historians
Indian documentary filmmakers
Indian documentary film directors